Edward Hughes (born 1876) was a professional footballer who played for clubs including Everton, Tottenham Hotspur and Clyde, and represented Wales on 14 occasions.

Career 
Hughes joined Tottenham in 1899 from Everton. At Spurs, the left half played one game of the Southern League when Tottenham won the competition for the first time. The following season he was a member of the 1901 FA Cup Final winning team.

Career statistics

International

Honours
Tottenham Hotspur
 Southern League: 1899-1900
 FA Cup: 1900–01

References

External links 
1901 FA Cup final

1876 births
Welsh footballers
Wales international footballers
People from Ruabon
Sportspeople from Wrexham County Borough
Everton F.C. players
Tottenham Hotspur F.C. players
Clyde F.C. players
English Football League players
Southern Football League players
Year of death missing
Association football wing halves
FA Cup Final players